John A. Lankford (December 4, 1874 – July 2, 1946), American architect. He was the first professionally licensed African American architect in Virginia in 1922 and in the District of Columbia in 1924. He has been regarded as the "dean of black architecture".

Life

John Lankford was born on a farm near Potosi, Missouri on December 4, 1874. He attended Lincoln Institute and Tuskegee Institute, historically black colleges. He studied architectural and mechanical drawing from the International Correspondence School. He earned a Bachelor of Science from Shaw University in Raleigh, North Carolina in 1898. He earned Master of Science degrees from Morris Brown College and Wilberforce University.

He married Charlotte Josephine Upshaw in 1901. She was a granddaughter of Henry McNeal Turner, a bishop of the African Methodist Episcopal church, the first independent black denomination founded in the United States.

In 1902, Lankford moved to Washington, D.C. to finish the design of the True Reformer Building. He was appointed supervising architect for the African Methodist Episcopal denomination. He organized the National Negro Business League chapter in Washington, D.C. in 1905, and served as president of the National Technical Association from 1941 to 1942. His Southern Aid Society building in Richmond, Virginia is considered the "first exclusively African American office building in the country, being the result of a collaboration between a black patron, architect, and contractor."

He lived and worked at 1448 Q Street, NW, in Washington, D. C..

Lankford died on July 2, 1946 in Washington, D.C. and is buried at Lincoln Memorial Cemetery in Suitland, Maryland.

Buildings
Buildings he designed include:
Arnett Hall, Wilberforce University
Big Bethel African Methodist Episcopal Church, Atlanta, Georgia
Bethel African Methodist Episcopal Church, Columbia, South Carolina
Chapelle Administration Building at Allen University, which is a National Historic Landmark
Haven African Methodist Episcopal Church, Washington, DC
Southern Aid Society building, built 1908, stood at 527 N. 2nd Street, Richmond, Virginia
True Reformer Building, Washington, D.C.
Historic Bethel African Methodist Episcopal Church, 226 East Howry Avenue, DeLand, Florida

See also 

 African-American architects

References

External links
John A. Lankford Residence and Office, Cultural Tourism DC
"Past is present: D.C. buildings with a history", Biz Journals - Washington, 11 May 1998
 John Anderson Lankford at Findagrave

20th-century American architects
African-American architects
Lincoln University (Missouri) alumni
Shaw University alumni
Wilberforce University alumni
Morris Brown College alumni
Tuskegee University alumni
Methodists from Missouri
1874 births
1946 deaths
Architects from Missouri
People from Potosi, Missouri
Architects from Washington, D.C.
Methodists from Georgia (U.S. state)
Methodists from Virginia